Yavorivskyi National Park is located in the Ukrainian Roztocze, one of the most interesting physiographic regions of Western Ukraine. In the southeastern part of it the main European watershed, on the slopes of which originate rivers belonging to the basins of two seas - the Black Sea and the Baltic.

History 
The park was established July 4, 1998, by the President of Ukraine on the base of Yavorivskyi Regional Landscape Park (which existed here since 1996 in the area of ) and surrounding areas of Yavoriv military base and Maherivskoho forestry enterprises.
In the institution has 44 people, including the scientific division - 4, in the service of - 16 people.

Climate 
The climate of the area is typical for Roztocze that is located in the boundary zone of influence of Atlantic air currents from the west and continental - from the east. Overall climate is moderately humid. The most rainfall in June and July, and the lowest - in January and February. The hottest month - July and the coldest - January. Annual temperature fluctuations are small and reaches .

Geography 
For Yavorivskyi National Park as a whole for Roztocze characterized by high forest cover. Here most common hornbeam-oak and pine-oak and pine forests, and in depressions - alder. Beech forests grow near the Eastern border of the range and are confined to the hilly landscape. Interesting island surviving pockets of spruce, fir and sycamore, which remained on the northeastern limit of its range. By the middle Holocene relicts are beech and pine forests. Herbaceous vegetation occupies a much smaller area and formed by natural meadows and areas of former pastures and settlements, as well as along rivers and channels.
Due to favorable natural conditions National Park also has considerable recreational potential and is an interesting tourist destination.

References

National parks of Ukraine
Central European mixed forests